Piotr Paleczny (born 10 May 1946 in Rybnik, Poland) is a Polish classical pianist, winner of the 3rd prize of the VIII International Chopin Piano Competition in 1970.

In 1990 he served on the jury of the Paloma O'Shea Santander International Piano Competition; in 2010 on The Sendai International Music Competition in Japan; and in 2011 on the jury of the Prix AmadèO de Piano 2011.

He teaches piano at the Fryderyk Chopin University of Music in Warsaw, and has been a professor at the university since 1998.

References

External links 
Piotr Paleczny at culture.pl
"Keep Calm and Carry On" - Interview with Piotr Paleczny

Living people
Polish classical pianists
Male classical pianists
Prize-winners of the International Chopin Piano Competition
People from Rybnik
1946 births
Recipients of the Gold Medal for Merit to Culture – Gloria Artis
Recipients of the Gold Cross of Merit (Poland)